Anna Kogan (1902–1974) was a Soviet artist.

Biography 
Kogan was born in Vitebsk, Russian Empire in 1902. From 1919 to 1922 she studied at the Higher Art School of Vitebsk under Kazimir Malevich.

In 2009 Artnews reported that she was an "enigma to art historians", due to a lack of biographical history and the fact that none of her works appeared in Russian Art Museums.

Her work is included in the collections of the Fine Arts Museums of San Francisco and the Seattle Art Museum.

References 

1902 births
1974 deaths
Soviet artists